Euless is a city in Tarrant County, Texas, United States, and a suburb of Dallas and Fort Worth. Euless is part of the Mid-Cities region between Dallas and Fort Worth. In 2020 Census, the population of Euless was 61,032. The population of the city increased by 19.02% in 10 years. The city's population was 51,277 as of the 2010 census.

The southwestern portion of Dallas/Fort Worth International Airport is inside the city limits of Euless.

History
Euless is named after Elisha Adam Euless, a native of Tennessee who moved to Texas in 1867 and later bought  of land on the current intersection of North Main St. and West Euless Boulevard. Euless started a cotton gin and a community center on his property and quickly became a prominent figure among other settlers. He was eventually elected county sheriff, both in 1892 and in 1894, after which Euless retired for health reasons. They developed around the land Euless owned, and the locals decided to name the city in honor of him.

Landmark Court Case
In 2009 the US Fifth Circuit Court of Appeals sided against the City of Euless in Merced vs Kasson. The City had tried to prohibit Mr. Merced (a Santeria priest) from practicing religious animal sacrifice in his home temple. The Court found that the city ordinances substantially burdened Mr. Merced's free exercise of religion and ordered that Mr. Merced could continue to practice his religious rituals. Also, the city was ordered to pay the plaintiff's court fees.

Geography

Euless is located at  (32.848253, –97.091782).

According to the United States Census Bureau, the city has a total area of 16.3 square miles (42.1 km2), all land.

Demographics

2020 census

As of the 2020 United States census, there were 61,032 people, 21,967 households, and 13,245 families residing in the city. 43.9% of the housing units were owned by the residents and the median value of the houses were estimated to be $200,500. 56.1% of the population lived in rented dwellings with median gross rent estimated to be $1,1536 per month. 6.1% of the population was under 5 years of age; similarly, 23% was under 18 years, 10.2% above 65% and 51% females. There were 2,376 veterans residing in the city. The average household size was 2.56 and the average family size was 3.31.

2000 census
As of the census of 2000, there were 46,005 people, 19,218 households, and 11,626 families residing in the city. The population density was 2,828.3 people per square mile (1,091.7/km2). There were 20,136 housing units at an average density of 1,237.9 per square mile (477.8/km2). The racial makeup of the city was 75.52% White, 6.49% African American, 0.64% Native American, 7.15% Asian, 1.86% Pacific Islander, 5.38% from other races, and 2.96% from two or more races. Hispanic or Latino of any race were 13.31% of the population.

There were 19,218 households, out of which 31.6% had children under the age of 18 living with them, 45.3% were married couples living together, 10.9% had a female householder with no husband present, and 39.5% were non-families. 31.0% of all households were made up of individuals, and 3.0% had someone living alone who was 65 years of age or older. The average household size was 2.38 and the average family size was 3.05. 1.26% of Euless households are same sex couples, giving Euless the ninth highest percentage of same sex couples among cities in Texas with over 50 same sex couples.

In the city, the population was spread out, with 25.0% under the age of 18, 9.8% from 18 to 24, 39.7% from 25 to 44, 19.7% from 45 to 64, and 5.8% who were 65 years of age or older. The median age was 32 years. For every 100 females, there were 98.6 males. For every 100 females age 18 and over, there were 98.0 males.

The median income for a household in the city was $49,582, and the median income for a family was $54,697. Males had a median income of $39,169 versus $32,370 for females. The per capita income for the city was $23,764. About 5.7% of families and 7.0% of the population were below the poverty line, including 9.5% of those under age 18 and 5.7% of those age 65 or over.

Tongan minority

Euless is notable for having one of the largest concentrations of Tongans outside of Tonga, with a community of 3,000–4,000 people.

The first Tongans to settle in Euless were either Siupeli Netane, an American Airlines employee, and his wife Halatono or the brothers Sione and Tevita Havea, students at the University of Texas at Arlington, depending on sources.

Nepalese minority
In some neighborhoods in Euless, the Nepalese community is quite culturally prevalent. Many people of Nepali origin have come as refugees from Bhutan. Due to a high concentration of Nepalese residents in the adjacent city of Irving, many important Nepalese cultural and national holidays are celebrated throughout Euless.

Surrounding cities
Euless is located within the Mid-Cities region between Dallas and Fort Worth. Other cities within  of Euless include Bedford to the west, Grapevine to the north, and Irving to the east.

Government

Local government
According to the city's 2007–2008 Comprehensive Annual Financial Report, the city's various funds had $82.7 million in revenues, $73.7 million in expenditures, $239.5 million in total assets, $76.8 million in total liabilities, and $54.7 million in cash and investments.

The structure of the management and coordination of city services is:

The Euless City Council as of Jan 2022 consisted of:

Mayor: Linda Martin
Place 1: Tim Stinneford, Mayor Pro Tem
Place 2: Jeremy Tompkins,
Place 3: Eddie Price
Place 4: Perry Bynum
Place 5: Harry Zimmer
Place 6: Tika Paudel

The city of Euless is a voluntary member of the North Central Texas Council of Governments association, the purpose of which is to coordinate individual and collective local governments and facilitate regional solutions, eliminate unnecessary duplication, and enable joint decisions.

Arbor Daze
Arbor Daze is a celebration of trees. It is usually held in the municipal complex on the last weekend of April from Saturday to Sunday. During Arbor Daze there is a business tent, an art tent and two concert stages, as well as a kids' tent called Kidz Zone. Parking is available anywhere in the municipal complex or at the nearby church, First Baptist Euless.

The Arbor Daze festival has received over 47 awards and recognitions for excellent programs and publications, making it one of the most decorated festivals in Texas.

Education

Euless has eight elementary schools, two junior high schools, and one high school. Most of Euless is served by the Hurst-Euless-Bedford Independent School District, some parts of the city belong to Grapevine-Colleyville Independent School District, Most GCISD residents are zoned to Bear Creek Elementary, with some to Grapevine Elementary School and Heritage Elementary School. Most GCISD grapevine students are zoned to Heritage Middle School, with some zoned to Colleyville Middle School. All are zoned to Colleyville Heritage High School.

There are two charter schools in the city: Harmony Science Academy (run by Harmony Public Schools) and Treetops School International.

The football team of Euless's Trinity High School has achieved national notoriety for its pre-game and post-game ritual dance, the New Zealand Māori Ka Mate haka, started by several players of Tongan descent. The team won 5A Division 1 state football championships in 2005, 2007, and 2009 and was featured in an EA Sports commercial in 2010.

Economy
According to the city's 2008 Comprehensive Annual Financial Report, the top employers in the city are:

Notable people

 Mike Baab, former NFL player for Cleveland Browns, and New England Patriots
 Aimee Buchanan (born 1993), American-born Olympic figure skater for Israel
 James T. Draper Jr., Baptist minister and denominational figure, former pastor of First Baptist Church of Euless
 Dianna Graves, member of the West Virginia House of Delegates
 Gary Hart, wrestler/manager, WCW,WCCW, Mid-Atlantic wrestling.
 Michael Muhney, actor on Veronica Mars and The Young and the Restless, graduated from Trinity High School
 Adam Roarke, movie actor who appeared in Hells Angels on Wheels, El Dorado, and The Stunt Man, was living in Euless at the time of his death
 Sarah Shahi, actress on The L Word
 Janine Turner, actress who starred on Northern Exposure, raised in Euless
 Myles Turner, professional basketball player who currently plays for the NBA's Indiana Pacers, was raised in Euless and attended Trinity High School

Climate
The climate in this area is characterized by hot, humid summers and generally mild to cool winters. According to the Köppen Climate Classification system, Euless has a humid subtropical climate, abbreviated "Cfa" on climate maps.

Recreation places
 Euless Family Life Center
 McCormick Park
 Bob Eden Park
 Villages of Bear Creek Park
 Children's Health StarCenter-Euless
 The Parks at Texas Star
 ItzUSA

References

External links

 City of Euless official website
 Map of Euless
 EulessOnline.com, online community for people that live, work & play in Euless
 HEB Chamber of Commerce
 Historic Photos of Euless, hosted by the Portal to Texas History
 More demographic data
 The webcomic Something Positive comments on Euless 
 Story about haka at Trinity High School, from The World radio program
Arbor Daze

 
Cities in Texas
Dallas–Fort Worth metroplex
Cities in Tarrant County, Texas